The Cottage is a 2008 British black comedy horror film, written and directed by Paul Andrew Williams.

Plot

Two brothers, David and Peter, kidnap Tracey, the stepdaughter of Arnie, an underworld crime boss. After a heated conversation at the kitchen table, Peter and David retrieve the unconscious Tracey from the car trunk. As they try to get her upstairs, Peter gets sidetracked by her chest, not realizing she has woken up. She headbutts him several times, and Peter screams with pain. David manages to get her off him and has to fix Peter's now bloody and broken nose after tying her to the bed frame. The pair hold her for ransom in a secluded country cottage. Things begin to go wrong when Arnie's dimwitted son and stepbrother of Tracey, Andrew, delivers the ransom. Instead of money, the bag is filled with napkins. David and Peter realize that not only have they been deceived, but Arnie knew about Andrew's involvement in the scheme all along.

After Peter breaks David's phone by accidentally dropping it in water, David goes down to the village to use a telephone box to call in another ransom. While there, he happens across some sinister locals who, upon learning that he and his companions are staying at the Barnarby Cottage, warn him to keep his doors locked and not to wander. Disturbed, David returns to the cottage to find that Tracey — who has proven to be highly intelligent and resourceful, albeit foul-mouthed and somewhat psychopathic — has incapacitated Andrew and abducted Peter.

Some distance away, Peter and Tracey arrive at an ominous-looking farm. Upon entering the house, they soon discover it to be the home of an insane and hideously deformed serial killer known only as the Farmer.

After opening a trapdoor in the kitchen to reveal a secret staircase leading down into the cellar, Tracey is stabbed through the stomach by the Farmer. Terrified, Peter flees upstairs and jumps out of the bedroom window. Tracey survives her injury and calls out for Peter to help her escape, too, with the Farmer in pursuit. Peter incapacitates the Farmer with a shovel, saving Tracey's life. Tracey then urges Peter to kill the madman before he regains consciousness, but he is reluctant.

As the two of them argue, the Farmer comes to and quickly amputates the end of Peter's foot with the shovel. As he is about to kill Peter, Tracey begins mocking him, ordering him to hurry up and do it. Frustrated, the Farmer suddenly turns around and gruesomely decapitates her at mouth-level with the shovel. He then knocks out a hysterical Peter and hangs him by his jacket from a meat hook in the shed.

Meanwhile, Andrew and David discover Andrew's hairdresser Steven, dying from being disemboweled before setting off through the woods in search of Peter and Tracey, when they stumble across the dead body of one of Arnie's henchmen, who has had his throat slit. Soon after, they arrive at the farm, where they discover a shed full of severed heads. David and Andrew hurry outside, where the Farmer pins David to the ground with a pickaxe through his leg. He then chases Andrew into the nearby horse stables, where he viciously attacks him with a hunting knife before ripping his spine out.

Peter comes to and manages to release himself from the hook and crawl across the ground to David. After making up for a lifetime of squabbling, they vow to fight on and drag themselves back into the farmhouse in search of a phone. The Farmer soon reappears, tossing Andrew's severed head and spine through the window. David attempts to defend his brother, only to be suddenly impaled by The Farmer with the pickaxe. Outraged at seeing his brother murdered, Peter begins to throttle the Farmer to death by strangling him with a length of rope.

The Farmer manages to toss Peter down into the cellar and slam the door shut. But Peter still has the end of the rope, and he continues tugging on it, eventually causing the Farmer to collapse on top of the trap door. With the weight of the body on top of the door, Peter is unable to escape. With nowhere else to go, he descends down into the cellar. He flicks on his cigarette lighter to reveal the Farmer's equally insane and hideous wife and daughters standing all around him. He mutters, defeated, "You must be joking" before they set upon him; the lighter goes out, and Peter screams as they attack him.

After the credits, Arnie and his right-hand men arrive at the farm. As they step up to the front door, the Farmer suddenly rushes out at them with the pickaxe raised above his head. The image freezes as he swings at them with it, and the screen fades to black.

Cast

Andy Serkis as David
Reece Shearsmith as Peter
Steve O'Donnell as Andrew
Jennifer Ellison as Tracey
David Legeno as The Farmer
Steven Berkoff as Arnie (uncredited)
Johnny Harris as Smoking Joe (uncredited)
Danny Nussbaum as Man in Suit
Logan Wong as Muk Li San
Jonathan Chan-Pensley as Chun Yo Fu
Simon Schatzberger as Steven
James Bierman as Bouncer
Cat Meacher as Club Receptionist
Doug Bradley as Villager with Dog
Katy Murphy as Farmer's Wife
Georgia Groome as Farmer's Daughter 1
Eden Watson as Farmer's Daughter 2

Reception

The Cottage received positive reviews from critics, garnering a 71% certified "fresh" result on Rotten Tomatoes. Variety, ReelFilm, and MovieFone gave mostly positive reviews, with MovieFone criticizing the film's pacing issues but praising the movie's acting and banter.

Empire Magazine also reviewed the film, stating "Frightfest regulars and hungry gorehounds will get a kick out of this, but those who hailed Williams as a Brit-indie visionary after London To Brighton might be left scratching their heads."

References

External links
 

2008 films
2008 black comedy films
2008 comedy horror films
2000s crime comedy films
2000s serial killer films
British black comedy films
British comedy horror films
British crime comedy films
British slasher films
Films about cannibalism
Films about kidnapping in the United Kingdom
Films about brothers
Films set on farms
Backwoods slasher films
2008 comedy films
British exploitation films
British splatter films
2000s English-language films
2000s British films
British horror films